|}

The Middleton Stakes is a Group 2 flat horse race in Great Britain open to fillies and mares aged four years or older. It is run over a distance of 1 mile, 2 furlongs and 56 yards at York in May.

History
The event was established in 1981, and it was originally restricted to three-year-old fillies. The first running was won by Pipina.

The present version for older fillies was introduced in 1997. It initially held Listed status. It was promoted to Group 3 level in 2004, and to Group 2 in 2010.

The Middleton Stakes is currently staged on the second day of York's three-day Dante Festival meeting. It is run on the same day as the Dante Stakes.

Records

Most successful horse:
 no horse has won this race more than once

Leading jockey (4 wins):
 Pat Eddery – Pipina (1981), Glowing with Pride (1984), Gull Nook (1986), Skimble (1992)
 Walter Swinburn – Nearctic Flame (1989), Hellenic (1990), Clare Heights (1991), Dayflower (1993)

Leading trainer (7 wins):
 Sir Michael Stoute – Nearctic Flame (1989), Hellenic (1990), Bathilde (1996), Zee Zee Top (2003), Promising Lead (2008), Crystal Capella (2009), Queen Power (2021)

Winners

See also
 Horse racing in Great Britain
 List of British flat horse races

References

 Paris-Turf:
 Racing Post:

 galopp-sieger.de – Middleton Stakes.
 ifhaonline.org – International Federation of Horseracing Authorities – Middleton Stakes (2019).
 pedigreequery.com – Middleton Stakes – York.

Middle distance horse races for fillies and mares
York Racecourse
Flat races in Great Britain
1981 establishments in England
Recurring sporting events established in 1981